Emanuel Fernandes may refer to:

 Emanuel Jardim Fernandes (born 1944), Portuguese politician
 Emanuel Fernandes (beach volleyball) (born 1967), beach volleyball player from Angola